Almazna is a small city in Kadiivka Municipality, Luhansk Oblast of Ukraine. The population of Almazna was estimated to be . Industries within Almazna include metallurgy and manufacturing; a coal mine is also located near the city.

Since 2014, Almazna has been under the effective control of the self-proclaimed Luhansk People's Republic.

References

Cities in Luhansk Oblast
Cities of district significance in Ukraine
Populated places established in the Russian Empire
Yekaterinoslav Governorate